The Big Iron River is a  river in western Ontonagon County on the Upper Peninsula of Michigan in the United States. It flows northwards, entering Lake Superior at the village of Silver City.

See also
List of rivers of Michigan

References

Michigan Streamflow Data from the USGS

Rivers of Michigan
Rivers of Ontonagon County, Michigan
Tributaries of Lake Superior